Solna Municipality ( or) is a primary settlement (or village) and a municipality in Stockholm, Sweden, located just north of Stockholm City Centre. Its seat is located in the town of Solna, which is a part of the Stockholm urban area. Solna is one of the richest municipalities in Sweden.

The municipality is a part of Metropolitan Stockholm. None of the area is considered rural, which is unusual for Swedish municipalities, which normally are of mixed rural/urban character. Solna is the third smallest municipality in Sweden in terms of area.

Solna borders Stockholm Municipality to the south, southeast and northwest; to Sundbyberg Municipality to the west; to Sollentuna Municipality to the north; and to Danderyd Municipality to the northeast. The boundary with Danderyd Municipality is delineated by the Stocksundet strait.

There are two parishes in Solna Municipality: Råsunda (population 29,677) and Solna (population 28,317). Solna Parish once included parts of present-day City of Stockholm.

Solna is divided into eight traditional parts with no administrative functions: Bergshamra, Haga, Hagalund, Huvudsta, Järva, Råsunda, Skytteholm and Ulriksdal. The largest districts are Råsunda, Hagalund and Huvudsta, with the Solna Centrum in between them.

With few exceptions, Solna's built-up areas have a suburban character, but there are also several large parks and Friends Arena, Sweden's new national football stadium adjacent to the Solna station of Stockholm commuter rail.

The final matches of both the 1958 FIFA (men's) World Cup and the 1995 FIFA Women's World Cup were played at Råsunda Stadium, the national football stadium from 1937 to 2012 (demolished in 2013).

Solna has attracted a wide range of businesses and authorities, making it a major place of work in Greater Stockholm. Among the most important employers are the medical university Karolinska Institutet and the Karolinska University Hospital. The European Centre for Disease Prevention and Control (ECDC) and the Stockholm International Peace Research Institute (SIPRI) are also located in Solna.

Demography

Population development

Income and education
The population in Solna Municipality has the 16th highest median income per capita in Sweden, and the share of highly educated persons, according to Statistics Sweden's definition: persons with post-secondary education that is three years or longer, is 46.0% (national average: 27.0%) and the 5th highest in the country.

Residents with a foreign background
On 31 December 2017 the number of people with a foreign background (persons born outside of Sweden or with two parents born outside of Sweden) was 30 601, or 38.39% of the population (79 707 on 31 December 2017). On 31 December 2002 the number of residents with a foreign background was (per the same definition) 14 986, or 26.02% of the population (57 585 on 31 December 2002). On 31 December 2017 there were 79 707 residents in Solna, of which 23 597 people (29.60%) were born in a country other than Sweden. Divided by country in the table below – the Nordic countries as well as the 12 most common countries of birth outside of Sweden for Swedish residents have been included, with other countries of birth bundled together by continent by Statistics Sweden.

Local government
As with all 290 municipalities of Sweden, Solna has a municipal assembly (kommunfullmäktige), holding 61 members elected by proportional representation for a four-year term. An executive committee (kommunstyrelse) is appointed by its members.

List of mayors since 1943
1943–1956 CA Andersson (S)
1956–1967 KA Larsson (S)
1968–1976 CG Eklund (L)
1977–1982 Sune Berglund (M)
1983–1988 Gösta Fagerberg (S)
1989–1991 Karl Gustav Svensson (S)
1991–1994 Anders Gustâv (M)
1994–1998 Karl Gustav Svensson (S)
1998–2006 Anders Gustâv (M)
2006 Anders Ekegren (L)
2006–2011  Lars-Erik Salminen (M)
2011 Anders Ekegren (L) – 8 June – 24 July
2011–2012  Lars-Erik Salminen (M)
2012-2022 Pehr Granfalk (M)
2022- Sara Kukka-Salam (S)
(M) = Moderate Party
(S) = Social Democratic Party
(L) = Liberal Party

Public transport
Solna is centrally located in the Stockholm area and is well served by the Stockholm public transport system with two commuter train stations and six metro stations as well as a dense bus network run by SL. It was served by trams until 1959. Light rail returned after 54 years of absence when Tvärbanan was extended from Alvik to Solna centrum. A further extension to Solna Station opened in 2014.

Economy

Skanska, 
NextJet, 
and Vattenfall have their head offices in Solna.
Mall of Scandinavia has opened in November 2015 and is located in Solna.

The head office of Scandinavian Airlines and SAS Group is located in Solna. The airline head office was formerly located on the property of Stockholm Arlanda Airport in Sigtuna Municipality, but now it is back in Solna.

Sights

Haga Park, part of the Royal National City Park, was initiated by king Gustav III (1771–1792), planned and carried out in the English landscaping style.
The city features three of Sweden's royal palaces: Haga Palace, Ulriksdal Palace, and Gustav III's Pavilion.
Friends Arena, the Swedish national arena of association football, and home of local football club AIK.
Mall of Scandinavia, Scandinavia's biggest shopping mall
The Solna Church was constructed in the 12th century. For defensive purposes, it was built as a round church, and is one of a few of that kind in Sweden.

Sports

The following football clubs are located in Solna:
 AIK
 Blue Hill KF
 Råsunda IS
 Vasalunds IF

The bandy department of AIK has been very successful on the women's side, with several national titles in recent years. The men's team has gotten promoted to Elitserien 2019-20.

Education

Solna Gymnasium is the senior high school/sixth form college of Solna.

International relations

Twin towns – Sister cities
Solna is twinned with:
 Gladsaxe, Denmark
 Ski, Norway
 Pirkkala, Finland
 Valmiera, Latvia
 Burbank, California, USA

Partnerships
In addition to this, Solna has two cooperating cities,
 Kalamaria, Greece 
 Bemowo, Poland

See also

:Category:People from Solna Municipality
Football World Cup 1958
1992 European Football Championship
FIFA Women's World Cup 1995

References

External links

Solna Municipality - Official site 
Solna Municipality - Tourist Guide in English

See also
Solna

 
Municipalities of Stockholm County
Municipal seats of Stockholm County
Swedish municipal seats
Populated places in Stockholm County
Metropolitan Stockholm
Stockholm urban area